Sidney Bernstein may refer to:

 Sid Bernstein (editor) (1907–1993), co-founder and editor of Advertising Age, Chairman of Crain Publications
 Sid Bernstein (impresario) (1918–2013), who brought the Beatles and the Rolling Stones to the United States, and organized rock concerts
 Sidney Bernstein, Baron Bernstein (1899–1993), British media baron
 Sidney Norman Bernstein (1911–1992), American chess master</onlyinclude>